All Quiet on the Western Front is a television film that was produced by ITC Entertainment. It was released on November 14, 1979, and stars Richard Thomas and Ernest Borgnine. It is based on the 1929 book of the same name by Erich Maria Remarque. The film was directed by Delbert Mann. The film was a joint British and American production for which most of the filming took place in Czechoslovakia.

Plot
In 1915, 18-year-old Paul Bäumer enlists in the German army with five of his high school friends (Behm, Kropp, Muller, Kemmerich and Leer), after being indoctrinated by Kantorek, their teacher, as to the glory and superiority of German culture. After surviving training camp under the brutal Corporal Himmelstoss, the young men board a troop train bound for the front line. Ominously, at the same moment, they notice another train arriving in town loaded with returning wounded soldiers, who are carried off on stretchers.

Once at the front line, they are placed in a squad, along with soldiers Tjaden, Westhus, Detering and others, under the supervision of Stanislaus "Kat" Katzinsky. Kat teaches them how to take cover, how to find extra food, and other survival skills.

When Paul and his squad return to a French town for a rest week, they see the new recruits have grown younger and younger. To their delight, the leader of these new recruits is their recently demoted training NCO, Himmelstoss. When Himmelstoss tries to make them obey him, they stand up to him. Later in the trenches, while the Germans are launching an attack, Paul sees another squad cowering in a crater, which includes Himmelstoss. Paul forces Himmelstoss to keep on the offensive.

The French and German armies are shown attacking each other repeatedly over a few hundred yards of torn, corpse-strewn land. Kemmerich is wounded, and later dies in an overcrowded army hospital. Paul returns to the trenches with his squad, distraught over Kemmerich's death.

When a French soldier falls into a crater Paul is hiding in, Paul stabs the man in the stomach with his trench dagger. Forced to spend the night with him, Paul tries to bandage the dying soldier's wounds, but he dies anyway. Paul escapes from the crater, stricken with guilt. An inexperienced new recruit, after falling into a pit of poison gas, is carried off by the medics to a slow, painful death; the medics had appeared before Kat could put him out of his misery.

Although Paul, Kropp and Leer have their first sexual experience with a trio of accommodating French village girls, the vast majority of the young men's experiences are horrific. One by one, practically all of Paul's schoolmate friends die. A haughty Kaiser Wilhelm II (Denys Graham) visits their camp to ceremoniously pin medals on heroic soldiers, which includes Himmelstoss.

When Paul's squad is bombed in a French town close to the front, Behm dies while Kropp loses a leg and Paul is seriously wounded. Paul improves and he is granted two weeks' leave. Returning home, Paul's sister tells him that their mother is dying of cancer. In visits to a beer garden and to his former teacher, Paul realises that his town's older men, in their enthusiasm for war, have no sense of the horrors they have sent their youth to. He also visits Kemmerich's mother and lies to her that he did not suffer.

Paul returns to duty, Kat is wounded in the leg by an artillery shell and Paul carries him many miles to a field hospital. Only at the hospital does Paul discover that Kat has died, bleeding out to a piece of shrapnel in his back at some point during the journey.

Paul writes a letter to Kropp, the sole survivor of their class, who is now an amputee. After finishing the letter, Paul walks through the trench checking on the younger soldiers, having taken up Kat's position as a mentor. He spots a bird and begins to sketch it. The bird starts to fly away, and as Paul stands up to see where it went, a sniper's shot rings out, killing him. A field communique from the German High Command is captioned over Paul's lifeless body, declaring "All Quiet on the Western Front", the date on the communique showing '11 October 1918', exactly one month before the Armistice of 11 November 1918.

Cast

Production
The film maintains a very authentic look throughout its course. Paul and his friends are clearly part of an industrialized war machine that ruthlessly uses them despite the soldiers having only a vague understanding of what they are fighting for. Authentic details such as new replacement soldiers seen in the film getting younger and younger as the story progresses are reflective of how Germany, like most of the combatants, struggled to find new recruits for the ranks of their armies at the front as the war progressed. Norman Rosemont paid Remarque's widow, Paulette Goddard, $100,000 for the film rights.

Reception
The film won the Golden Globe Award for Best Motion Picture Made for Television as well as an Emmy Award for Outstanding Film Editing for a Limited Series or a Special.

Theatrical release and home media
The original 150-minute US TV version was edited and received a limited worldwide theatrical release. The resulting 129-minute version was the one subsequently released on open matte (4:3 aspect ratio) VHS videos and DVDs. Commencing with the 2009 UK Blu-ray, all DVDs and Blu-rays feature the original, unedited version. All of these, bar the 4:3 UK (ITV) and Australian (Beyond Home Entertainment) Blu-rays, are also in the film's cropped widescreen aspect ratio.

References

External links
 
 
 
 

1979 television films
1979 films
1970s war drama films
Remakes of American films
American war drama films
Anti-war films about World War I
CBS network films
Cultural depictions of Wilhelm II
Films based on German novels
Films based on military novels
Films based on works by Erich Maria Remarque
Films directed by Delbert Mann
Hallmark Hall of Fame episodes
Television remakes of films
Western Front (World War I) films
World War I films based on actual events
World War I television films
All Quiet on the Western Front
American drama television films
1970s English-language films
1970s American films